Stuntman is the fifth solo album released by Tangerine Dream leader Edgar Froese, in 1979.

Froese later remixed the album and released it with a new cover.

The album utilizes much the same instruments and equipment heard on Froese's previous albums; electric guitar, Moog Synthesizer (including sequencer), Mellotron, PPG 340/360, and other keyboards.  On this release there are six tracks (originally three to each side of an LP) instead of two side-long tracks as found on, for example, his album Epsilon in Malaysian Pale (1975).

Track listing 
All tracks written, performed and produced by Edgar Froese

References

1979 albums
Edgar Froese albums